Naurang Serai Sugar Mill Siding railway station is  located in Lakki Marwat District,
Khyber Pakhtunkhwa, Pakistan.

See also
 List of railway stations in Pakistan
 Pakistan Railways

References

External links

Railway stations in Lakki Marwat District
Railway stations on Bannu–Tank Branch Line